Bamboo saxophone may refer to:

Various inexpensive keyless folk versions of the saxophone made of bamboo
The xaphoon (also called Maui xaphoon or bamboo sax)